George W. "Rock" Pring is a Professor of Law at the University of Denver Sturm College of Law.  He coined the acronym SLAPP for "Strategic Lawsuit Against Public Participation" and is the co-author, together with Penelope Canan, of SLAPPs: Getting Sued for Speaking Out.

References

External links 
 Professor Pring's official page at the University of Denver

Year of birth missing (living people)
Living people
University of Denver faculty